The National Guideline Centre (NGC), formerly known as the National Clinical Guideline Centre, is hosted by the Royal College of Physicians,

The guidelines provide recommendations for good practice by healthcare professionals. The guidelines are also intended to help patients make informed decisions, to improve communication between the patient and healthcare professional, and to raise the profile of research work. They are generally provided in a full-length version and in various simplified formats for different purposes and audiences. Examples of guidelines produced by NCGC include: Patient experience (Guidance and Quality Standard), Epilepsy, Hypertension, Stable angina, Hip fracture, Anaemia management in chronic kidney disease, Sedation in children and young people, Nocturnal enuresis in children, Transient loss of consciousness, and Chronic heart failure.

References

External links
 

Health in the City of Westminster
Health care quality
Medical and health organisations based in the United Kingdom
NHS special health authorities
Organisations based in the City of Westminster
Royal College of Physicians